Draper Triangle Ventures is a Pittsburgh based venture capital firm.

History
Draper Triangle is organized as a Limited Liability Company, created November 11, 1999 in Delaware and is registered as a foreign corporation with the Pennsylvania Department of State. Draper Triangle proports to be an early stage venture capital firm, focusing in the Midwest. 

The firm further notes that it has previously invested in companies including toa technologies (acquired by Oracle), BodyMedia (acquired by Jawbone), CardioInsight (acquired by Medtronic), BitArmor (acquired by Trustwave), Renal Solutions (Acquired by Fresenius), and Carnegie Learning (acquired by Apollo Group).

Investment focus

Draper Triangle Ventures focuses on the following areas of investment: software as a service (SaaS), platform as a service (PaaS), big data, artificial intelligence, robotics, IoT, augmented reality, healthcare IT.

Firm
Partners at the firm include Michael Stubler and Jay Katarincic.

Draper Triangle invests in companies based primarily in Pittsburgh, Pennsylvania, Ohio, and Michigan.

Draper Venture Network
Draper Triangle is a member of the Draper Venture Network. The network provides access to the collective intelligence of 100+ investors and more than $3B invested in over 500 ventures around the world. Member funds include Draper Associates, Dalus Capital, Draper Athena, Draper Nexus, Wavemaker Partners, Draper Esprit, 3TS Capital Partners, and Wamda Capital.

References

Companies based in Pittsburgh
Financial services companies established in 1999
Venture capital firms of the United States
1999 establishments in Pennsylvania